Adolphe Cayron (28 September 1878 – 7 September 1950) was a French cyclist. He competed in the men's sprint event at the 1900 Summer Olympics.

References

External links
 

1878 births
1950 deaths
French male cyclists
Olympic cyclists of France
Cyclists at the 1900 Summer Olympics
Place of birth missing
Sportspeople from Aveyron